Katharine Teresa Gun (née Harwood) (born 1974) is a British linguist who worked as a translator for the Government Communications Headquarters (GCHQ). In 2003, she leaked top-secret information to The Observer, concerning a request by the United States for compromising intelligence on diplomats from member states of the 2003 Security Council. The diplomats were due to vote on a second United Nations resolution on the prospective 2003 invasion of Iraq.

Early life
Katharine Harwood moved to Taiwan in 1977 with her parents, Paul and Jan Harwood. Her father had studied Chinese at Durham University and now teaches at Tunghai University in the city of Taichung, central Taiwan. She has a younger brother who teaches in Taiwan.

After spending her childhood in Taiwan, where she attended Morrison Academy until the age of 16, Katharine returned to Britain to study for her A-levels at Moira House School, a girls' boarding school in Eastbourne. Her upbringing later led her to describe herself as a "third culture kid". In 1993 she began studying Japanese and Chinese at Durham University.

Gun graduated with an upper second-class degree, then took a job as an assistant English teacher with the JET program in Hiroshima, Japan. She left teaching in 1999, and after some temporary jobs, finding it difficult to find work as a linguist, Gun applied to GCHQ in 2001, after reading a newspaper advertisement for the organisation. Gun had previously been unaware of GCHQ, later saying that "I didn't have much idea about what they did...I was going into it pretty much blind. Most people do."

Leak
Gun's regular job at GCHQ in Cheltenham was to translate Mandarin Chinese into English. While at work at GCHQ on 31 January 2003, Gun read an email from Frank Koza, the chief of staff at the "regional targets" division of the American signals intelligence agency, the National Security Agency.

Koza's email requested aid in a secret operation to bug the United Nations offices of six nations: Angola, Bulgaria, Cameroon, Chile, Guinea, and Pakistan. These were the six "swing nations" on the UN Security Council that could determine whether the UN approved the invasion of Iraq. The plan might have contravened Articles 22 and 27 of the Vienna Convention on Diplomatic Relations, which regulates global diplomacy.

Gun was outraged by the email, and took a printed copy of it home with her. After contemplating the email over the weekend, Gun gave the email to a friend who was acquainted with journalists. In February, she travelled to London to take part in the demonstration against the impending invasion of Iraq. Gun heard no more of the email, and had all but forgotten about it until Sunday 2 March, when she saw it reproduced on the front page of The Observer newspaper. Less than a week after the Observer story, on Wednesday 5 March, Gun confessed to her line manager at GCHQ that she had leaked the email, and was arrested. In a BBC interview with Jeremy Paxman, she said that she had not raised the matter with staff counsellors as she "honestly didn't think that would have had any practical effect". Gun spent a night in police custody, and eight months later was charged with breaking the Official Secrets Act. While waiting to hear whether she would be charged, Gun embarked on a postgraduate degree course in global ethics at Birmingham University.

Court case

On 13 November 2003, Gun was charged with an offence under section 1 of the Official Secrets Act 1989. Her case became a cause célèbre among activists, and many people stepped forward to urge the government to drop the case.  Among them were Reverend Jesse Jackson, Daniel Ellsberg (the US government official who leaked the Pentagon Papers), and Congressman Dennis Kucinich.

The case came to court on 25 February 2004. Within half an hour, the case was dropped because the prosecution declined to offer evidence. At the time, the reasons for the Attorney-General to drop the case were murky. The day before the trial, Gun's defence team had asked the government for any records of legal advice about the lawfulness of the war that it had received during the run-up to the war. A full trial might have exposed any such documents to public scrutiny, as the defence was expected to argue that trying to stop an unlawful war of aggression outweighed Gun's obligations under the Official Secrets Act. Gun was defended by Alex Bailin KC. Speculation was rife in the media that the prosecution service had bowed to political pressure to drop the case so that any such documents would remain secret. A government spokesman said that the decision to drop the case had been made before the defence's demands had been submitted. The Guardian newspaper had reported plans to drop the case the previous week. On the day of the court hearing, Gun said, "I'm just baffled in the 21st century we as human beings are still dropping bombs on each other as a means to resolve issues." In May 2019 The Guardian stated the case was dropped "when the prosecution realised that evidence would emerge ... that even British government lawyers believed the invasion was unlawful."

In September 2019 Ken Macdonald, the former director of public prosecutions, said the case against Gun was not dropped in order to stop the Attorney General's advice on the legality of the Iraq War from being revealed. Macdonald stated that Gun would not have received a fair trial without the disclosure of information that would have compromised national security. Gavin Hood, the director of Official Secrets, expressed scepticism about Macdonald's statement and called for the declassification of the official documents referred to by Macdonald.

Personal life
Her husband, Yaşar Gün, is a Turkish Kurd. 
 Gun lives in Turkey and Britain. After the charges against her were dropped in 2004, she found it difficult to find a new job.  she has lived in Turkey with her husband and daughter for several years.

Later life
Gun received the Sam Adams Award for 2003 and was supported in her case by the UK human rights pressure group Liberty and in the US by the Institute for Public Accuracy.  Following the dropping of the case, Liberty commented, "One wonders whether disclosure in this criminal trial might have been a little too embarrassing."

Two years after her trial, Gun wrote an article titled "Iran: Time to Leak", which asked whistleblowers to make public any information about plans for a potential war against Iran. She urged "those in a position to do so to disclose information which relates to this planned aggression; legal advice, meetings between the White House and other intelligence agencies, assessments of Iran's threat level (or better yet, evidence that assessments have been altered), troop deployments and army notifications. Don't let 'the intelligence and the facts be fixed around the policy' this time."

In film
In January, 2019, the film Official Secrets, recounting Gun's actions in 2003, received its premiere at the Sundance Film Festival, with Keira Knightley playing Gun. Daniel Ellsberg praised the swiftness and importance of Gun taking action, saying it was in some ways more significant than his own whistleblowing on the Vietnam War. In July 2019, in a lengthy interview on the US program Democracy Now!, Gun, Gavin Hood (the film's director), and Martin Bright and Ed Vulliamy (the journalists who broke the story of the leaked memo) discussed the events that the film describes. Together with journalist Peter Beaumont, Gun advised and consulted over the years it took to make the film and they are "very happy with the result.”

Further reading 
  (additional    )

See also

 
 
 
 
 , cleared of breaking the Official Secrets Act, resulting in the law being tightened
 
 List of whistleblowers (worldwide, all sectors)

References

 Democracy Now! Interviews:
 9 September 2004 (archive) Katharine Gun together with Danish former intelligence officer Frank Grevil
 
 
 Links to news stories (2003–2006) about Katharine Gun

People of the Iraq War
Women in the Iraq War
Causes and prelude of the Iraq War
GCHQ people
Linguists from the United Kingdom
Women linguists
British whistleblowers
20th-century British translators
21st-century British translators
20th-century British women writers
21st-century British women writers
Alumni of St Mary's College, Durham
British expatriates in Taiwan
British expatriates in Turkey
Living people
1974 births